Microcolona is a genus of moths of the family Elachistidae described by Edward Meyrick in 1897.

Taxonomy
The genus is mostly placed in the family Elachistidae, but other authors list it as a member of the families Agonoxenidae or Blastodacnidae.

Species
Microcolona arizela Meyrick, 1897
Microcolona aurantiella Sinev, 1988
Microcolona autotypa
Microcolona celaenospila Turner, 1916
Microcolona characta Meyrick, 1897
Microcolona cricota
Microcolona crypsicasis Meyrick, 1897
Microcolona dorochares
Microcolona embolopis Meyrick, 1897
Microcolona emporica
Microcolona epixutha Meyrick, 1897
Microcolona eriptila
Microcolona leptopis Meyrick, 1897
Microcolona leucochtha Meyrick, 1897
Microcolona leucosticta
Microcolona limodes
Microcolona nodata Meyrick, 1897
Microcolona omphalias
Microcolona pantominia
Microcolona phalarota
Microcolona polygethes Turner, 1939
Microcolona ponophora Meyrick, 1897
Microcolona porota
Microcolona pycnitis
Microcolona sollennis Meyrick, 1897
Microcolona spaniospila Turner, 1923
Microcolona technographa
Microcolona thymopis Meyrick, 1897
Microcolona toropis Meyrick, 1897
Microcolona transennata
Microcolona trigonospila Meyrick, 1897
Microcolona tumulifera

References

 
Moth genera